Martha Furnace is an unincorporated community in Centre County, in the U.S. state of Pennsylvania.  A variant name is "Martha".

History
Martha was founded about 1830, and named after Martha Curtin, the daughter of the proprietor of a local blast furnace.

References

Unincorporated communities in Pennsylvania
Unincorporated communities in Centre County, Pennsylvania